The 2000 Eastleigh Council election took place on 4 May 2000 to elect members of Eastleigh borough council in Hampshire, England. One third of the council was up for election and the Liberal Democrat party kept overall control of the council.

After the election, the composition of the council was
Liberal Democrat 28
Conservative 9
Labour 7

Election result

External links
 BBC report of 2000 Eastleigh election result

2000
2000 English local elections
2000s in Hampshire